John Sloane may refer to:
 John Sloane (Ohio politician) (1779–1856), U.S. representative and Treasurer of the United States
 John Eyre Sloane (1886–1970), American industrialist
 John L. Sloane (1847–1897), mayor of Missoula, Montana.

See also
 Jonathan Sloane (1785–1854), U.S. Representative from Ohio
 John Sloan (disambiguation)